In 2019, some rugby union national teams played matches in preparation for the 2019 Rugby World Cup. The matches saw New Zealand lose first place in the World Rugby Rankings, initially to Wales, and eventually to Ireland.

Fixtures

22 June

Notes:
 Pablo Miejimolle (Spain) made his international debut.
 This was Spain's largest winning margin over Uruguay, surpassing the 17-point difference set in 2016.

13 July

Notes:
 Fiji's win ended a 16-match losing streak against the Maori All Blacks, dating back to 1957.

20 July

10 August

Notes:
 Mike Haley and Jean Kleyn (both Ireland) and Callum Braley and Marco Riccioni (both Italy) made their international debuts.
 Marco Zanon withdrew at the last moment due to injury, being replaced by the wing/fullback Matteo Minozzi.

11 August

Notes:
 Willi Heinz, Lewis Ludlam, Joe Marchant, and Jack Singleton (all England) made their international debuts.
 Alun Wyn Jones (Wales) became his country's most-capped player with 135 international appearances; 126 for Wales, 9 for the British and Irish Lions.
 Wales' defeat ended their record 14-match unbeaten streak.
 Sam Underhill, Henry Slade and Ruaridh McConnochie were named in England's starting lineup at open-side flanker, outside centre and right wing respectively, but were all ruled out due to injury. Tom Curry moved to open-side as Lewis Ludlam took Curry's place at blind-side, while Jonathan Joseph and Joe Cokanasiga replaced Slade and McConnochie. Courtney Lawes and Manu Tuilagi took Ludlam and Cokanasiga's places on the bench. Tomos Williams was also to start as the replacement scrum half for Wales but was also ruled out. He was replaced by Aled Davies.

12 August

17 August

Notes:
 Liam Wright (Australia) made his international debut.
 New Zealand retained the Bledisloe Cup.
 This was Steve Hansen's 100th test as head coach of New Zealand.

Notes:
 With this result, Wales became the fourth team to be placed number 1 in the World Rugby Rankings, ending New Zealand's 10-year run at the top dating back to 16 November 2009.
 England failed to score in a first half for the first time since their 2011 World Cup quarter-final versus France.
 Ruaridh McConnochie was named as England's right wing but was ruled out with injury for the second week running. He was replaced by Anthony Watson. Liam Williams was also ruled out at fullback for Wales and replaced by Leigh Halfpenny.
 Following George North's try, when Dan Biggar took a quick penalty before England's Ben Youngs had come on for Willi Heinz, World Rugby changed Law 3 so that play cannot restart until a player who has gone off due a blood or head injury has been temporarily replaced.

Notes:
 Siyabonga Ntubeni (South Africa) and Santiago Carreras and Lucas Mensa (both Argentina) made their international debuts.
 Jerónimo de la Fuente (Argentina) earned his 50th test cap.

Notes:
 Russia played a Tier 1 nation outside a Rugby World Cup for the first time since their game against Italy in 2006. Russia most recently played a Tier 1 nation, Australia, during the 2011 Rugby World Cup. 

Notes:
 François Cros, Peato Mauvaka, Alivereti Raka and Emerick Setiano (all France) and Scott Cummings and Rory Hutchinson (both Scotland) made their international debuts.

24 August

Notes:
 Grant Stewart and Blade Thomson (both Scotland) made their international debuts.
 Wesley Fofana was to start at inside centre for France but was ruled out through injury. Gaël Fickou moved to the inside while Sofiane Guitoune came in to the outside.
 Nigel Owens was due to assistant referee in this match but was reassigned to referee the England v Ireland game in place of Jaco Peyper who withdrew from his officiating duties in that game due to a delayed flight. Andrew Brace replaced Owens on the touchline.

Notes:
 England recorded their largest win over Ireland, surpassing the 40 point margin set in 1997. England's 57 points total was their highest score against Ireland, surpassing the 50 points scored in 2000.
 Jaco Peyper was the appointed match referee but missed the game due to a delayed flight. Nigel Owens replaced him.

27 August

30 August

Notes:
 Tommaso Allan (Italy) earned his 50th test cap.

31 August

Notes:
 This was Warren Gatland's last home game in charge of Wales.
 Rhys Carré and Owen Lane (both Wales) made their international debuts.
 This ended Wales' 11-match home unbeaten run.
 With this loss, Wales dropped from number one in the World Rugby Rankings, after only spending two weeks at the top.

Notes:
 Scotland became the first Tier One nation to play a Test match in Georgia.

6 September

Notes:
 Takuya Kitade (Japan) made his international debut.
 Pieter-Steph du Toit (South Africa) earned his 50th test cap.
 This was the first time that Japan has hosted South Africa.

Notes:
 Ruaridh McConnochie (England) made his international debut.
 This was the first time England had played in Newcastle upon Tyne and the first home match played away from Twickenham since playing Uruguay at City of Manchester Stadium during the 2015 Rugby World Cup, and the first non-Rugby World Cup game since playing Argentina at Old Trafford in 2009.

7 September

Notes:
 This was Steve Hansen's last home game in charge of New Zealand.
 Josh Ioane (New Zealand) and Vunipola Fifita and Siua Maile (both Tonga) made their international debuts.
 No replacement was brought on for Ryan Crotty.

Notes:
 Rob Valetini (Australia), Michael Ala'alatoa and Scott Malolua (both Samoa) made their international debuts.

Notes:
 This was the last home game for Rory Best, playing for Ireland.
 This was Joe Schmidt's last home game in charge of Ireland.
 With this win, Ireland became the fifth team to be placed number 1 on the World Rugby Rankings, replacing New Zealand who had briefly retaken top spot from Wales after Ireland's earlier win against Wales the previous week.

Notes:
 Blaine Scully (United States) earned his 50th test cap.

See also
 2019 World Rugby Pacific Nations Cup
 2019 Rugby Championship
 2019 June rugby union tests

References

2019
Warm-up Matches